The Gardens is a suburb of Johannesburg, South Africa. A small northern suburb that is surrounded by Highlands North, Orchards, and Oaklands, it is located in Region E of the City of Johannesburg Metropolitan Municipality.

History
The suburb was developed in 1902.

References

Johannesburg Region E